Yogesh Ramdas Kadam son of Ramdas Kadam is an Indian politician serving as Member of the Maharashtra Legislative Assembly from Dapoli Vidhan Sabha constituency as a member of Shiv Sena.

Positions held
 2019: Elected to Maharashtra Legislative Assembly

References

External links
  Shivsena Home Page 

Members of the Maharashtra Legislative Assembly
Year of birth missing (living people)
Living people
Shiv Sena politicians